Onzy Warren Elam (born December 1, 1964) is a former American football linebacker who played three seasons in the National Football League with the New York Jets and Dallas Cowboys. He was drafted by the New York Jets in the third round of the 1987 NFL Draft. He played college football at Tennessee State University and attended Miami Northwestern Senior High School in Miami, Florida.

References

External links
Just Sports Stats

Living people
1964 births
Players of American football from Miami
American football linebackers
Tennessee State Tigers football players
New York Jets players
Dallas Cowboys players
Miami Northwestern Senior High School alumni